Terry Charles (born July 8, 1979) is a former wide receiver in the NFL. He played two seasons in the NFL, for the San Diego Chargers and Houston Texans.

NFL career

2002
Charles was selected 142nd overall by the Chargers in the 2002 NFL Draft. Unfortunately, he suffered a torn anterior cruciate ligament in his left knee during training camp and was placed on season-ending injured reserve, effectively ending his rookie season before it could begin.

2003
After missing out on his rookie season, Charles struggled to perform the following year and was released by the Chargers during final cuts on August 31. He received workouts with the Seattle Seahawks, Dallas Cowboys, and Houston Texans, trying to get back into the league.

2004
Despite not playing during the 2003 season, Charles was signed to a future contract by the Texans on February 6 and was allocated to NFL Europe. He suffered another injury early in the NFL Europe season in June and was released from the Texans soon after.

References

External links
KFFL Player Page

1979 births
Living people
American football wide receivers
Portland State Vikings football players
San Diego Chargers players
Houston Texans players
Players of American football from Long Beach, California
Scottish Claymores players